William Eric Phillips, CBE, DSO, MC (1892 or 1893 - 1964) was a Canadian businessman. Phillips was the chairman and chief executive officer of Massey Ferguson, at the time of his death the largest producer of farm machinery in the British Commonwealth, and founding chairman of Argus Corporation, a position he held until his death.

Biography

Phillips was born in Willowdale, Ontario, Canada. He entered the British Army as a private soldier at the outbreak of World War I. In 1916 he won field promotion to lieutenant-colonel, at 24 years of age the youngest in the army. He was awarded the Military Cross and the Distinguished Service Order. Phillips graduated from the University of Toronto in 1919 with a degree in chemical engineering.  He established his own company, W.E. Phillips Ltd, in Oshawa, Ontario, in 1922, to supply auto glass for General Motors of Canada.

During World War II, Phillips was appointed head of Research Enterprises, Ltd., a Canadian crown corporation intended to produce optical instruments, and later assigned production of radar equipment. He was created a Commander of the Order of the British Empire for these services.

At the end of World War II, Phillips joined E.P. Taylor and others in Argus Corporation, becoming chairman of this investment firm in November 1945. He would hold this position until his death in December 1964. He was reputed the intellectual superior of this tightly-knit group of investors.

From 1945 until the year of his death he was chairman of the board of directors of the University of Toronto.

Massey Ferguson

Phillips was recruited to the chairmanship of what later became Massey Ferguson by E.P. Taylor at the end of World War II. By 1946, Taylor and Phillips possessed or controlled eight per cent of Massey common stock.  They convinced Victor Emanuel, president of the AVCO Manufacturing Corporation, to purchase 6.4% of Massey's float; when this was disagreeable to the management of the firm, Argus purchased that block as well. This block of common stock formed the single largest group of shares in the firm, a position from which they would dominate its actions from 1947 onwards.

Family
Phillips married Eileen McLaughlin, the eldest of five daughters to R.S. McLaughlin, the founder of General Motors of Canada.  The marriage ended in 1945.

References

Bibliography
 

Canadian chairpersons of corporations
20th-century Canadian businesspeople
1964 deaths
1890s births
People from Old Toronto
Canadian chemical engineers
Canadian Commanders of the Order of the British Empire
Canadian Companions of the Distinguished Service Order
Canadian recipients of the Military Cross